The Alberta Scotties Tournament of Hearts is the Alberta provincial women's curling tournament run by Curling Alberta. The winning team represents Alberta at the Canadian women's national championship, called the Scotties Tournament of Hearts.

Past winners
(National champions in bold)

References

External links
Alberta Women's Curling Champions

Scotties Tournament of Hearts provincial tournaments
Curling in Alberta